Orthaga lithochroa is a species of snout moth in the genus Orthaga. It is found in Australia.

References

Moths described in 1916
Epipaschiinae
Endemic fauna of Australia